Shi Xie may refer to:

Shi Xie (士燮)
 , also known as Fan Xie (范燮) or Fan Wen-zi (范文子), head of the Fan lineage (范氏) of Qi clan (祁姓), one of the six major office-holding families of the state Jin in Spring–Autumn period.
 Shi Xie, official in late Han dynasty and early Three Kingdoms period.